Heazlewoodite, Ni3S2, is a rare sulfur-poor nickel sulfide mineral found in serpentinitized dunite. It occurs as disseminations and masses of opaque, metallic light bronze to brassy yellow grains which crystallize in the trigonal crystal system. It has a hardness of 4, a specific gravity of 5.82. Heazlewoodite was first described in 1896 from Heazlewood, Tasmania, Australia.

Paragenesis 
Heazlewoodite is formed within terrestrial rocks by metamorphism of peridotite and dunite via a process of nucleation. Heazlewoodite is the least sulfur saturated of nickel sulfide minerals and is only formed via metamorphic exsolution of sulfur from the lattice of metamorphic olivine.

Heazlewoodite is thought to form from sulfur and nickel which exist in pristine olivine in trace amounts, and which are driven out of the olivine during metamorphic processes. Magmatic olivine generally has up to ~4000 ppm Ni and up to 2500 ppm S within the crystal lattice, as contaminants and substituting for other transition metals with similar ionic radii (Fe2+ and Mg2+).

During metamorphism, sulfur and nickel within the olivine lattice are reconstituted into metamorphic sulfide minerals, chiefly millerite, during serpentinization and talc carbonate alteration.
When metamorphic olivine is produced, the propensity for this mineral to resorb sulfur, and for the sulfur to be removed via the concomitant loss of volatiles from the serpentinite, tends to lower sulfur fugacity.

In this environment, nickel sulfide mineralogy converts to the lowest-sulfur state available, which is heazlewoodite.

Occurrence 
Heazlewoodite is known from few ultramafic intrusions within terrestrial rocks. The Honeymoon Well ultramafic intrusive, Western Australia is known to contain heazlewoodite-millerite sulfide assemblages within serpentinized olivine adcumulate dunite, formed from the metamorphic process.

The mineral is also reported, again in association with millerite, from the ultramafic rocks of New Caledonia.

This mineral has been found in meteorites including irons and CV carbonaceous chondrites.

See also 
 Glossary of meteoritics
 Serpentinite
 Metamorphism
 Olivine
 Dunite or peridotite
 Millerite
 Polydymite
 Vaesite

References 

 Guillon J.H. and Lawrence L.J., The opaque minerals of the ultramafic rocks of New Caledonia, Mineralium Deposita, volume 8, 1973, pp. 115–126.

Nickel minerals
Sulfide minerals
Meteorite minerals
Trigonal minerals
Minerals in space group 155